Macedonian Patriotic Organization (MPO) is the oldest organization of Americans and Canadians of Macedonian descent in North America. It was founded in Fort Wayne, Indiana, USA, in 1922, by Macedonian Bulgarian immigrants originating mainly from Greek Macedonia. It was originally called the Macedonian Political Organization but changed its name to the current in 1952.

The initial objective of the MPO was to advocate for a solution to the Macedonian Question in the form of an independent Macedonian state, in which all ethnic groups would enjoy equal human rights and freedoms. Over the decades, the MPO has evolved significantly, and today it is a not-for-profit corporation that promotes and preserves the customs, history, and traditions of Macedonian-Americans and Macedonian-Canadians. In the past, the organization has generally promoted the view that Macedonian Slavs are Bulgarians, but today it unites both Macedonian Bulgarians and ethnic Macedonians. The MPO supports the independent Republic of North Macedonia and is involved in pro-Macedonian advocacy within the US and Canada.

Since 1926 MPO has published The Macedonian Tribune, which is the oldest continuously published Macedonian newspaper in the world. Originally published in Bulgarian, the paper gradually began including articles written in English, before finally transitioning into its current, English-only format, in the early 1990s.

History

Background

A century of Ottoman maladministration over Macedonia as well as the Ilinden Uprising of 1903 caused thousands of Macedonians to emigrate to places of safety and security – mainly in the United States and Canada. By the early 1920s, there were around 35,000 Macedonian immigrants in North America, most of whom have well established themselves in various industries and trades. It is important to note that in those days the majority of the Slavic population of Macedonia declared themselves as Macedono-Bulgarians, and considered themselves to be a part of the Bulgarian people – as did the majority of early Macedonian immigrants to North America. All of their early churches, schools, benevolent associations and cultural centers were named "Macedono-Bulgarian", emphasizing their strong Macedonian regional and cultural identity.

First Macedonian associations in the United States date back to 1899, with the foundation of the "Macedonian-Bulgarian Society Vasil Levski". Other associations include "Bulgarian-Macedonian American Committee" founded in 1904, "Nadezhda" founded in 1908, etc. In September 1913, delegates from Macedonian organizations in the United States and Canada gathered in Chicago, Illinois to form a Macedonian-Bulgarian National Union. The union published the newspaper "Svoboda", and had as its objective the autonomy for Ottoman Macedonia and the Adrianople area. Some members of these organizations participated in the Balkan Wars as volunteers in the Macedonian-Adrianopolitan Volunteer Corps

Following World War I, Macedonia was divided by Serbia, Greece and Bulgaria. In the parts conquered by Serbia and Greece, the new administrators forced out most of the Bulgarian priests and teachers, and began implementing a forceful state-sponsored Serbianizatons and Hellenization of Slavic-speaking Macedonians. These harsh policies of political, cultural and religious repression in Serbian and Greek Macedonia were conducted with the consent of France and Great Britain, in spite of the warning by well-known political experts that the unsolved Macedonian problem would keep the Balkans in constant turmoil. This had a devastating effect on Macedonians in the United States and Canada and triggered a wave of apathy and indifference. All attempts to keep the Macedonian groups together met with failure, and eventually lead to the disillusion of the Macedono-Bulgarian National Union.

Foundation and Ideology

The Macedonian Patriotic Organization was formed in these turbulent years following the World War I, when prospect for freedom by many oppressed groups were dashed. The appeals for a renewed struggle first came from Fort Wayne, Indiana. and Steelton, PA., which were the bastions of Macedonian immigration, and were followed by Macedonian groups in Indianapolis, Gary, Indiana, Lansing, Detroit, Dayton, Springfield, Ohio, Cincinnati and New York City. Ft. Wayne was chosen as the site for the first formative convention, which took place on October 2, 1922, with a handful of delegates, most of whom were Ilinden veterans. The first convention charted a framework within which to build the structure of the new organization, and considerable attention was given to find an appropriate name for it. The proposal for Macedonian Patriotic Organizations was rejected because after the defeat of the Central Powers in the World War I, the word "patriot" had assumed a repulsive meaning. The convention settled for the name of Macedonian Political Organizations – which, in 1956 was changed to the original proposal – Macedonian Patriotic Organizations (MPO).

MPO's Articles of Incorporation from 1925 defined its purpose as follows: "For the mutual assistance and protection of people of Macedonian race - and for the liberation of Macedonia from political entities - and to foster the ancient right of Macedonia as a state and nation - all as more fully set out in its bylaws[.]" Throughout the next several annual conventions, the delegates finalized the organization's bylaws. The unchanged fundamentals of this document are still guiding the MPO into the third millennium. The first article of the MPO bylaws states: "The Macedonian Immigrants of the United States and Canada, as well as their descendants, regardless of nationality, religion, sex or convictions, realizing the necessity of joint organized activity for the liberation of Macedonia, formed the Macedonian Patriotic Organization with the slogan 'Macedonia for the Macedonians'." The historic phrase "Macedonia for the Macedonians", which was adopted as an official slogan of the MPO, was a proclamation of William Gladstone, who in 1897 expressed his views on the Macedonian Question.

The bylaws specify in Article 6. eligibility for MPO membership. "A regular member of these organizations can be any person over 18 years of age, born in Macedonia or of Macedonian descent, who accepts and maintains the aim of these by-laws and pledges himself to fulfill its regulations." As written originally, the bylaw's concept of "Macedonians" and "Macedonian emigrants" had only geographic and not ethnographic meaning, and was equally valid for all ethnic groups in Macedonia, which in those days included Bulgarians, Aromanians and Megleno-Romanians, Turks, Albanians, Greeks etc. Even the latest version of the bylaws, from 2016, retains this very definition of the terms “Macedonians” and "Macedonian emigrants".

The aim of the MPO, as defined in Article 2. of the bylaws, is: "To work for strengthening the feelings of loyalty and patriotism among the immigrants and their descendants toward the respective countries where they live – The United States and Canada;" and "To strive in a legal manner for the establishment of Macedonia as an independent state unit within her historic and geographic boundaries, which should constitutionally guarantee the ethnic, religious, cultural and political rights and liberties of all citizens."

For the accomplishment of the above purposes, the MPO founders defined in Article 4. of the bylaws very specific means for the Organization: "It publishes newspapers, books and brochures to disseminate the truth regarding the just cause of Macedonia and informs the public opinion on the correct solution of the Macedonian problem." and "It presents the Macedonian cause before foreign nations, legislative bodies, international institutes and societies through memorandums, petitions, statements, protests, resolutions, etc."

Early Activism

 

Since its inception, the MPO has advocated to organize and educate the emigrants in civil values, and to prepare them for fighting in favor of Macedonian liberation. Over the next seven decades the MPO directed its activities toward the establishment of an independent and united Macedonian state that would "guarantee constitutional, ethnic, religious, cultural and political rights and freedoms of all of its citizens."

The different phases that the Macedonian Question went through have put a pressure upon MPO to develop new modern means to achieve its aims. To fulfill the stipulations of the MPO bylaws, the delegates to the 4th annual MPO Convention in 1925 in Indianapolis, decided to establish a newspaper that was to become an official organ of the organization. The newspaper was founded under the name Macedonian Tribune, and its publication began under the guidance and leadership of the MPO Central Committee's Secretary Jordan Tchkatroff on February 10, 1927. Tchkatroff's activities have raised attention of Yugoslav Diplomatic and Consular services in the US, which already have watchful eye over the MPO.

During the 1930s and 1940s, the MPO openly supported the agenda of the right-wing faction of the Internal Macedonian Revolutionary Organization (IMRO), led by Ivan Mihailov. This was acknowledged by a CIA analyst report from 1953, which dubbed the MPO as "the US branch of the IMRO", and asserted that through its then secretary Luben Dimitroff, it acted as a money raising organ to support Mihailov's activities. Ivan Mihailov's influence in the MPO was eventually diminished in the 1970s, when a younger generation of leaders, led by Ivan Lebamoff and Christo Nizamoff, confronted Mihailov's authoritarianism, and removed his supporters from leadership positions.

When Bulgaria annexed parts of Vardar Macedonia and Greek Macedonia in April 1941, the MPO initially congratulated Bulgaria's actions and supported the policy of re-introducing the Bulgarian language and clergy. However, MPO changed its stance on this matter when Bulgaria declared war on the United States in December 1941, and henceforth fully supported the US war effort.

After the end of World War II, the MPO was openly opposed to the communist regimes in Belgrade and Sofia, as well as the oppressive government in Greece. In the case of Socialist Yugoslavia, the MPO initially sent a letter to President Josip Broz Tito congratulating him on the establishment of an autonomous Macedonia within the federation, however, the organization soon raised its voice against the historiographic revisionism that was taking place in Yugoslavia, which aimed at diminishing the Bulgarian cultural and historic heritage in Macedonia. In the 70s, the Macedonian Tribune regularly printed articles and appeals by the last leader of the IMRO, Ivan Mihailov. His memoirs (written in Bulgarian) were advertised by the paper and were avidly read.

Throughout the period of the Cold War, the MPO continuously advocated with the United States and Canadian governments, the United Nations, and other relevant international factors for a solution to the Macedonian Question that would involve self-government for Macedonians under a United Nations protectorate. The organization also worked on raising international awareness regarding violations of human rights in all three parts of Macedonia

Over the years a number of the Americans born of Macedonian Bulgarian descent began having less and less knowledge of Bulgaria and often identify themselves simply as Macedonians. Also, in 1990s MPO began openly accepting and embracing the ethnic Macedonian identity, alongside the Macedono-Bulgarian identity of the organization's founders. On February 22, 1990, the Macedonian Tribune published an article by then President Ivan Lebamoff, where he stated that MPO is responding to change in Macedonia, throughout the world, and in the organization itself by recognizing the reality of ethnic Macedonians, and by inviting them to join the ranks of the MPO as equals.

MPO approached the third millennium with great enthusiasm connected with the establishment of the independent Macedonian state – the Republic of North Macedonia.

Advocacy for Macedonia

The MPO played an enormous role for the recognition of Macedonia's independence. The country seceded from communist Yugoslavia on September 8, 1991, amending its constitutional name from Socialist Republic of Macedonia to "Republic of Macedonia". Only days after the parliament of the then Republic of Macedonia declared its independence, a delegation of the MPO visited Washington, DC in an attempt to lobby with the US government to recognize the former as an independent state. The delegation was received by U.S. senators from Indiana, Dan Coats and Richard Lugar, as well as by members of the House of Representatives MPO's activism, in addition to diplomatic activities by officials from North Macedonia finally yielded some results, and on April 8, 1992 the country was admitted to the UN.

To exert pressure for North Macedonia's international recognition, MPO President Ivan Lebamoff sent a resolution prepared at the Detroit MPO Convention to many heads of state around the world.

In September 1992 the MPO organized the "Forum on Macedonian Unity", which brought together the leaders of the MPO, the United Macedonians of Toronto and the representatives from the VMRO-DPMNE. The delegates agree on a common goal – a free and independent Macedonia, and the result of the forum was a resolution in which they demanded the international recognition of the country. In December 1992, the MPO began coordinating efforts to bring humanitarian aid to North Macedonia.

Both the existence of an independent Macedonian state, as well as the fact that it used the term "Macedonia" in its name created a lot of political tension in neighboring Greece - which paved the way for the diplomatic-political conflict between Greece and then Republic of Macedonia known as the Macedonia naming dispute. Throughout the period of the naming dispute, the MPO has officially supported North Macedonia's right to use its former constitutional name, "Republic of Macedonia".

Throughout 1992, the Greek diaspora in the United States and Canada demonstrated against the recognition of the independence of North Macedonia, above all against the name of the new state containing the word "Macedonia." They claimed that Macedonia was an ancient Greek name and that the newly declared independent state is stealing this name from them The Greek Orthodox Archdiocese of America also demanded that Republic of North Macedonia's independence not to be recognized by the United States. In reaction to this, MPO President Ivan Lebamoff sent protest letters against this position to the patriarchs and bishops of Eastern Orthodox Churches worldwide as well as to numerous newspapers. He also demanded from Macedonian Americans to enhance their propaganda activities towards getting the then Republic of Macedonia internationally recognized as soon as possible. Macedonian Americans responded to his call with a mass campaign of writing numerous articles in American newspapers and making phone calls to U.S. senators.

MPO also used its influence in the US Senate to assist North Macedonia's stabilization efforts. MPO President Ivan Lebamoff asked Indiana Senator Lugar to propose that the United States sends US troops to North Macedonia. Lebamoff also informed Macedonian President Kiro Gligorov about his proposal. MPO proposal was also supported by the chairman of the House Committee on Foreign Affairs, Rep. Fascell. In November 1992, the MPO asked Macedonian Americans to call the White House Hotline directly to ask President Bush to immediately recognize the Republic of North Macedonia.

In 1994, members of the MPO Central Committee visited Washington, DC several times in order to further press the US government to recognize North Macedonia. For this reason, MPO decided to have its 76th Convention in 1995 in Washington, DC. The keynote speaker of the 1995 Convention was Jane Kirkpatrick, former US Ambassador to the UN. Furthermore, in July 1996, MPO President Col. Boris Chaleff met with President Bill Clinton and Vice-President Al Gore, with whom he lobbied for an early NATO admittance of North Macedonia.

In July 1998, the first Macedonian Ambassador to the US visited the MPO headquarters in Fort Wayne. In 2004, a MPO delegation met President George W. Bush at the White House to persuade him to recognize North Macedonia under its former constitutional name – which his government did in 2004.

MPO Today
Since the late 1990s, the MPO is operating as a multi-faceted not-for-profit corporation that focuses on preserving and promoting Macedonian heritage in North America. On the pages of the Macedonian Tribune, as well as during regular "Day of Learning" events, the MPO promotes Macedonian customs, history, and traditions, and celebrates the achievements of Macedonian-Americans and Macedonian-Canadians and their contributions to their respective countries. Occasionally, the MPO also engages in charitable endeavors in the United States, Canada, North Macedonia, and Bulgaria.

Identities 
 

Regarding the question of MPO's attitude towards Macedonia's historic and contemporary identities, in 2015, then president Jordan Lebamoff wrote an article in the Macedonian Tribune in which he explains that when visited his relatives in Kastoria, Florina, and Skopje, he used to carry with him three letters: one written in Bulgarian, one in Macedonian, and the other in Greek. He explains that regardless of whether his relatives believed that they were Greek, Bulgarian or Macedonian, they were to him family. Further in the article he states the following:

The various ethnic identifications connected to the name Macedonia have often caused a lot of misunderstandings. For example, in 1992 Sen. Alfonse D'Amato (R-NY) addressed former MPO president Ivan Lebamoff as a distinguished member of the Greek-American community. Lebamoff responded that he is not a Greek, and that Macedonians are not Greeks. In his response, Lebamoff stated:

With reference to the question of the ethnic character of the organization, in 2012, MPO veteran and former Macedonian Tribune editor Lou Todorov said that the MPO is neither an ethnic Macedonian nor an ethnic Bulgarian organization, but that is patriotic organization of all the people from Macedonia, who share the ideal of a free, independent and united Macedonia. To better illustrate the subject, he further explained that:

With regard to MPO's relationship with the Republic of North Macedonia, in 2018, MPO Board of Trustees member Nick Stefanoff stated the following:

Miscellaneous 
In an unofficial interview for a Macedonian newspaper, former MPO President George Lebamoff sharply criticized the lack of democracy in the Republic of Macedonia, as well as the official misinterpretations of Macedonian history, with an emphasis on the Bulgarian historic heritage in country. At the 2009 MPO Convention, past Central Committee President Andrea Alusheff was said to have illegally expelled the Toronto MPO chapter "Switzerland of the Balkans", because of the latter's alleged pro-Bulgarian bias. Once Alusheff's mandate expired, the new Central Committee reinstated the MPO "Switzerland of the Balkans" into the organization. On the other hand, a former chapter of MPO from Toronto called MPO "Luben Dimitroff", splintered from the Canadian MPO and started publishing a parallel Macedonian Tribune in the pre-World War II Bulgarian orthography, espousing pro-Bulgarian views. This publication has been dismissed as unauthorized by the Macedonian Patriotic Organization.

Chronology

1922 MPO founded, Fort Wayne
1925 Macedonian Press Bureau founded, New York City
1927 Macedonian Tribune first published on February 10, Indianapolis
1927 National MPO Ladies' Section founded
1940 Almanac Macedonia published 1946 National YMPO founded
1983 Macedonian Tribune moved to Fort Wayne
1986 Freedom Monument dedicated, Fort Wayne
1990 Indiana Historic Marker dedicated at site of first Macedonian Tribune office, Indianapolis
1994 MPO purchases Macedonian Tribune Building, Fort Wayne
1995 Macedonian Veterans Association founded
1995 Macedonian Professional Association founded
1995 Wreath Laid at Tomb of the Unknowns, Arlington National Cemetery
1996 MPO establishes Homepage on the World Wide Web at www..org

MPO local chapters
The Macedonian Patriotic Organization currently has 8 local chapters in cities in the United States and Canada. Those current MPO chapters are:
 Chicago, Illinois, MPO "Pirin"
 Cincinnati, Ohio: Bistritsa
 Columbus, Ohio, MPO "Freedom"
 Detroit, Michigan, MPO "Fatherland"
 Fort Wayne, Indiana, MPO "Kostur"
 New Jersey Region, MPO "Strumishkata Petorka"
 Toronto, MPO "Victory"
 Youngstown, Ohio, MPO "Todor Alexandroff"

Former MPO chapters
 Brownsville, Pennsylvania MPO "Jordan Tchkatroff" 
 Canton, Ohio, MPO "Boris Sarafoff" 
 Chicago, Illinois, MPO "Independence"
 Cincinnati, Ohio, MPO "Bistritsa"
 Cleveland, Ohio, MPO "Vardar"
 Gary, Indiana, MPO "Rodina"
 Granite City, Illinois MPO "Bashtin Krai" 
 Indianapolis, Indiana, MPO "Damian Grueff"
 Lackawanna, New York, MPO "Jordan Gurkoff" 
 Lorain, Ohio, MPO "Alexander the Great"
 Los Angeles, California, MPO "Brothers Miladinoff" 
 Mansfield, Ohio, MPO "Ohrid"
 Massillon, Ohio, MPO "Christo Matoff"
 Newark, New Jersey, MPO "Strumishkata Petorka" 
 Northwest Indiana Region, MPO "Rodina"
 Phoenix, Arizona, MPO "United"
 Rochester, New York, MPO "Simeon Eftimoff" 
 Steelton, Pennsylvania, MPO "Prilep"
 Springfield, Ohio, MPO "Solun"
 Syracuse, New York, MPO "Independent Macedonia" 
 Washington, D.C., MPO "Liberty"
 Toronto, MPO "Pravda" 
 Toronto, Ontario, MPO "Switzerland of the Balkans"
 Toronto, Ontario, MPO "Luben Dimitroff"
 Sao Paulo, Brazil, MPO "Strumishkata Petorka"

See also
Macedonian Bulgarians
Internal Macedonian Revolutionary Organization
Macedonian nationalism
Macedonians (Greeks)

References

Sources
MPO Promotional Pamphlet. 2005 (Page 1, Page 2, Page 3)
Sojourners and Settlers: The Macedonian Community in Toronto to 1940  By Lillian Petroff
Encyclopedia of Canada's Peoples  By Paul R. Magocsi
The Bulgarian-Americans – Page 71 by Nikolay G. Altankov
An American Macedonian, George Lebamoff

External links

Photos of items displayed in the "Macedonian Museum of North America", operated by the MPO
"What is the National Character of the Macedonian Slavs", Indianapolis, Indiana, USA, 1971
"The Case for an Autonomous Macedonia", Indianapolis, Indiana, USA, 1945
"The Plight of the Bulgarians under the Rule of Serbs and Greeks from 1912 up to the Present Day", Indianapolis, Indiana, USA
"Dr. James F. Clarke's Speech. Guest-Speaker 58th MPO Convention. Macedonia from S.S. Cyril and Methodious to Horace Lunt and Blazhe Koneski: Language and Nationality", Indianapolis, Indiana, USA, 1982
"Macedonians in North America", Toronto, Canada, 1960
Macedonian Almanac (in Bulgarian)
"Balkan Locarno and the Macedonian question", Indianapolis, 1928
The Balkans. Useful Information for All Those Interested in the Situation of the Balkans (An Authoritative Turkish Document)", Indianapolis, Indiana, USA, 1969
"Macedonian, Bulgarian and Macedonian Struggle", published in "Macedonian Tribune", issue 113, Indianapolis, USA, 1929 (in Bulgarian)
"Disclosure on the Situation of the Bulgarians in Greek Macedonia", Indiana, USA, 1960

Macedonian American history
Bulgarian-American history
Organizations based in Indiana
Patriotic societies
Organizations established in 1922
1922 establishments in Indiana
Organizations based in Fort Wayne, Indiana
Culture of Fort Wayne, Indiana
Anti-communist organizations in the United States
Internal Macedonian Revolutionary Organization
Macedonian Question